Sayed Redha Isa Hasan Radhi Hashim (born 7 August 1994) is a Bahraini footballer who plays as a midfielder for Al-Riffa and the Bahrain national team.

Career
Isa was included in Bahrain's squad for the 2019 AFC Asian Cup in the United Arab Emirates.

Career statistics

International

International goals

References

External links
 
 
 
 
 Sayed Redha Isa at WorldFootball.com

1994 births
Living people
Bahraini footballers
Bahrain international footballers
Association football midfielders
Malkiya Club players
Riffa SC players
Bahraini Premier League players
2019 AFC Asian Cup players